Calcasieu Lake is a brackish lake located in southwest Louisiana, United States, located mostly within Cameron Parish.

Big Lake is well known among Gulf Coast anglers as a destination for red drum (redfish) and spotted sea trout (speckled trout) as well as flounder and brown and white shrimp. It is not uncommon for anglers to catch speckled trout at seven pounds (3.2 kg) or larger in this estuary.

On June 24, 2007, a rare albino "pink" bottlenose dolphin, Pinky, was spotted by a charter fishing-boat captain based in Lake Charles.

See also
 List of lakes of the United States#Louisiana

References

Bodies of water of Calcasieu Parish, Louisiana
Bodies of water of Cameron Parish, Louisiana
Lakes of Louisiana
Estuaries of Louisiana